Maxime Partouche (born 5 June 1990) is a French professional footballer who plays as a midfielder and forward for Régional 1 club Boulogne-Billancourt.

Club career

Paris Saint-Germain 

Partouche began his career with his local club Vélizy Football in Paris. In July 2002, he moved to Paris Saint-Germain. After spending six years in the club's youth system, he was promoted to the senior squad in March 2008, and made his debut on the 18th of that month in a Coupe de France match against Bastia.

His performance against Bastia earned him regular appearances on PSG's bench for Ligue 1 matches, though he regularly played for PSG's CFA team during the 2007–08 and 2008–09 seasons. He finally made his Ligue 1 debut on 7 February 2009 in a 4–1 victory over Nantes, coming on as a late-match substitute.

On 18 February 2009, Partouche made his European debut in a match against Wolfsburg in the round of 32 of the UEFA Cup. He came on as a substitute in the 71st minute as PSG were victorious 2–0 thanks to two late goals from Guillaume Hoarau.

Panionios 
On 15 September 2010, Partouche signed a three-year deal with Panionios, but returned to France after just a one-year spell. He never played in any league match for the Greek club.

Créteil 
In June 2011, Partouche joined Championnat National side Créteil. He scored a total of 3 league goals in 32 appearances in one season at the club, but left after the expiration of his one-year contract.

Real Salt Lake Reserves 
In July 2012, Partouche completed a trial with Major League Soccer side Real Salt Lake. He eventually played in an MLS Reserve League match for Real Salt Lake Reserves against Colorado Rapids Reserves on 5 August.

Versailles 
Partouche joined Versailles in October 2012 after training with the team for over a month. There, he reunited with his former PSG youth coach Franck Bentolila.

Jura Sud 
In January 2014, Partouche signed for Jura Sud. He would stay at the club two seasons, making 65 league appearances and scoring 9 goals in that time.

Boulogne-Billancourt 
Partouche signed for Boulogne-Billancourt in June 2016.

International career
Partouche is a France youth international, having played at U16, U17, and U18 level. He participated in the 2009 UEFA European Under-19 Championship with the under-19 team. He played in all four of the squad's matches, including the semi-final, where they suffered elimination, losing 3–1 in extra time to England.

Honours 
Paris Saint-Germain

 Coupe de France runner-up: 2007–08

References

External links
 
 Maxime Partouche at L'Équipe (in French)

1990 births
Living people
Footballers from Yvelines
French footballers
Association football midfielders
Association football forwards
Paris Saint-Germain F.C. players
Panionios F.C. players
US Créteil-Lusitanos players
Real Salt Lake players
FC Versailles 78 players
Jura Sud Foot players
AC Boulogne-Billancourt players
Ligue 1 players
Championnat National players
Championnat National 2 players
Régional 1 players
France youth international footballers
French expatriate footballers
Expatriate footballers in Greece
French expatriate sportspeople in Greece